In the history of the Russian Empire, and Polish–Lithuanian Commonwealth, arendator (literally "lease holder") was a person who leased fixed assets, such as land, mills, inns, breweries, or distilleries, or of special rights, such as the right to collect customs duties, etc. Individuals trusted by state officials were often given such rights to collect rent or revenue and were allowed to keep a portion of the money in exchange for this service, sometimes as a reward for other services to the state. The practice is called "rent/revenue farming".

The 1913 Webster's dictionary gives the following definition:

||Ar`en*da"tor (?), n. [LL. arendator, arrendator, fr. arendare, arrendare, to pay rent, fr. arenda yearly rent; ad + renda, F. rente, E. rent. Cf. Arrentation and Rent.] In some provinces of Russia, one who farms the rents or revenues.

Many estates of absentee landlords in the Polish–Lithuanian Commonwealth during the 16–18th centuries were managed by arendators. A significant part of them were Jews, which was an economic reason of antisemitism.

This extremely lucrative fiscal practice was also common in tax collecting in medieval Spain and France. There were frequently problems with corruption. The practice continued in the Russian Empire until the late 19th century.

References 

Obsolete occupations
Economic history of Poland
Economic history of Ukraine
Economic history of Russia
Economic history of Spain
Economic history of France